Krishna Nagar is an Indian para-badminton player from Rajasthan. He had been ranked world number 2 in para-badminton men's Singles SH6. He has won a gold medal at 2020 Summer Paralympics.

Career 
In the 2018 Asian Para Games in Indonesia, Krishna Nagar won a bronze medal in the singles event.

In the 2019 BWF Para-Badminton World Championships in Basel, Switzerland Krishna Nagar won the silver medal in the men's doubles event alongside compatriot Raja Magotra. He also won a bronze in the singles event.

In the 2020 Summer Paralympics in Tokyo, Japan, Krishna Nagar won the Gold Medal in men's singles SH6.

Achievements

Paralympic Games 
Men's singles SH6

World Championships 

Men's singles

Men's doubles

Mixed doubles SH6

Asian Para Games 

Men's singles

BWF Para Badminton World Circuit (2 titles, 1 runner-up) 
The BWF Para Badminton World Circuit – Grade 2, Level 1, 2 and 3 tournaments has been sanctioned by the Badminton World Federation from 2022.

Men's singles

Mixed doubles

International Tournaments (12 titles, 8 runners-up) 
Men's singles

Singles

Men's doubles

Doubles

Mixed doubles

Awards
 2021 – Khel Ratna Award, highest sporting honour of India.

References

Notes 

1999 births
Living people
Indian male badminton players
Indian sportspeople
Indian people with disabilities
Indian male para-badminton players
Indian disabled sportspeople
Paralympic badminton players of India
Badminton players at the 2020 Summer Paralympics
Paralympic gold medalists for India
Paralympic medalists in badminton
Medalists at the 2020 Summer Paralympics
Recipients of the Khel Ratna Award